Balka is a small rural settlement in the Snizhne urban hromada, Horlivka Raion, Donetsk Oblast. The population is 47 people. 

Until 2016 the settlement was called Chervonyi Zhovten.

External links
 Profile at the Verkhovna Rada website

Villages in Horlivka Raion